Salvia plectranthoides is an annual or biennial plant that is native to Guangxi, Guizhou, Hubei, Shaanxi, Sichuan, and Yunnan provinces in China, along with Bhutan and Sikkim in India. It is typically found growing on hillsides, along valley streams, and forests at  elevation.

Notes

plectranthoides
Flora of China